Contestável (Portuguese: to Contest) was a magazine published in Lisbon, Portugal, in the 1970s. The magazine was published by RAL 1, which was a left-wing light artillery regiment. The group was also known as Soldiers of the Light Artillery Regiment. It was one of the significant groups in the formation of Armed Forces Movement and the Carnation Revolution in 1974.

References

Carnation Revolution
Defunct magazines published in Portugal
Defunct political magazines
Magazines with year of establishment missing
Magazines published in Lisbon
Political magazines published in Portugal
Portuguese-language magazines
Socialist magazines